Fahrudin Hodžić (born 8 September 1963) is a Bosnian wrestler. He competed in the men's Greco-Roman 90 kg at the 1996 Summer Olympics.

References

External links
 

1963 births
Living people
Bosnia and Herzegovina male sport wrestlers
Olympic wrestlers of Bosnia and Herzegovina
Wrestlers at the 1996 Summer Olympics
Place of birth missing (living people)